Joseph Matesic (born November 11, 1929) is a former American football player who played for Pittsburgh Steelers of the National Football League (NFL). He played college football at Indiana University and Arizona State University.

References

1929 births
Living people
American football tackles
Indiana Hoosiers football players
Arizona State Sun Devils football players
Pittsburgh Steelers players
Players of American football from Pittsburgh